Gerard ter Borch (December 1617 – 8 December 1681), also known as Gerard Terburg, was a Dutch genre painter who lived in the Dutch Golden Age. He influenced fellow Dutch painters Gabriel Metsu, Gerrit Dou, Eglon van der Neer and Johannes Vermeer. According to Arthur K. Wheelock Jr., Ter Borch "established a new framework for subject matter, taking people into the sanctum of the home", showing the figures' uncertainties and expertly hinting at their inner lives. His influence as a painter, however, was later surpassed by Vermeer.

Biography
Gerard ter Borch was born in December 1617 in Zwolle in the province of Overijssel in the Dutch Republic.

He received an excellent education from his father Gerard ter Borch the Elder, also an artist, and developed his talent very early. The inscription on a study of a head proves that Ter Borch was at Amsterdam in 1632, where he studied possibly under Willem Cornelisz Duyster or Pieter Codde. Duyster's influence can be traced in a picture bearing the date 1638, in the Ionides Bequest (Victoria and Albert Museum, London). In 1634 he studied under Pieter de Molijn in Haarlem. A record of this Haarlem period is the Consultation (1635) at the Berlin Gallery.

In 1635, he was in London, and subsequently he travelled in Germany, France, Spain and Italy. His sister Gesina also became a painter. It is certain that he was in Rome in 1641, when he painted the small portraits on copper of Jan Six, A Young Lady (Six Collection, Amsterdam) and the portrait of a Gentlemen (DMK Collection Nuermberg). In 1648 he was at Münster during the meeting of the congress which ratified the treaty of peace between the Spaniards and the Dutch, and executed his celebrated little picture, painted upon copper, of the assembled plenipotentiaries—a work which, along with the a portrait of a Man Standing ("Portrait of a Young Man"), represents the master in the National Gallery in London. The picture was bought by the marquess of Hertford at the Demidoff sale for £7280, and presented to the National Gallery by Sir Richard Wallace, at the suggestion of his secretary, Sir John Murray Scott.

At this time Ter Borch was invited to visit Madrid, where he received employment and the honour of knighthood from Philip IV, but, in consequence of an intrigue, it is said, he was obliged to return to the Netherlands. He seems to have resided for a time in Haarlem; but he finally settled in Deventer, where he became a member of the town council, as which he appears in the portrait now in the gallery of the Hague. He died at Deventer in 1681.

Works
Ter Borch is a significant painter of genre subjects. He is known for his rendering of texture in draperies, for example in The Letter and in The Gallant Conversation, engraved by Johann Georg Wille.

Ter Borch's works are comparatively rare; about eighty have been catalogued. Six of these are at the Hermitage, six at the Berlin Museum, five at the Louvre, four at the Dresden Museum, three at the Getty Center, and two at the Wallace Collection.
A pair of portraits were located at the Corcoran Gallery in Washington D.C., highlighted in 2010 by Blake Gopnik.

The artist's painting The Suitor's Visit, c. 1658, oil on canvas, 80 x 75 cm (31½ × 29 9/16 in.) in the Andrew W. Mellon Collection, was used on the cover of Marilyn Stokstad's second edition of Art History.

Selected works

Claim for Nazi-looted art
In 2007, the heirs to the retail magnate Max Emden requested that the National Gallery of Victoria restitute the Gerard ter Borch painting Lady with a Fan which Emden had owned prior to the rise of the Nazis.

Notes

References

Further reading
Gerard Terburg (Ter Borch) et sa famille, by Emile Michel (Paris, 1887) on archive.org
Der künstlerische Entwickelungsgang des C. Ter Borch, by Dr W Bode (Berlin, 1881)
Maîtres d'autre fois, by Eugène Fromentin (4th ed., Paris, 1882)
 Gerard Ter Borch, by Eduard Plietzsch (1944) on archive.org
Vermeer and The Delft School, an exhibition catalog from The Metropolitan Museum of Art (fully available online as PDF), which contains material on Gerard ter Borch (see index)
The Milkmaid by Johannes Vermeer, an exhibition catalog from The Metropolitan Museum of Art (fully available online as PDF), which contains material on Gerard ter Borch (cat. no. 1)
Fifteenth- to eighteenth-century European paintings: France, Central Europe, the Netherlands, Spain, and Great Britain, a collection catalog fully available online as a PDF, which contains material on Gerard ter Borch (cat. no. 33-34)
Dutch and Flemish paintings from the Hermitage, an exhibition catalog from The Metropolitan Museum of Art (fully available online as PDF), which contains material on Gerard ter Borch (cat. no. 3-4)

External links

Works and literature on Gerard ter Borch

1617 births
1681 deaths
Dutch Golden Age painters
Dutch male painters
Dutch genre painters
Municipal councillors in Overijssel
People from Zwolle
Sibling artists